Max Grace (born 14 December 1942) is a former New Zealand cyclist. He competed in the individual road race and team time trial events at the 1964 Summer Olympics. In 1969 Grace switched nationalities to Canadian and went on to win three Canadian National Championships.

Major results
1961
2nd NZ NZ National Road Race Jr.
1962;
3rd NZ National Road Race Championship
1963;
7th NZ National Road Race Championship
1966;
4th NZ National Road Race Championship
1967;
2nd NZ National Road Race Championship
2nd NZ National 100k Team Time Trial Championship
1970 
 1st  Road race, National Road Championships
1971 
 1st  Road race, National Road Championships
1972 
 1st  Road race, National Road Championships
1973
 2nd National 100k Team Time Trial Championship
 2nd Gastown Grand Prix
1974
 1st Gastown Grand Prix
1975;
3rd Gastown Grand Prix

References

External links

1942 births
Living people
New Zealand male cyclists
Olympic cyclists of New Zealand
Cyclists at the 1964 Summer Olympics
Cyclists from Auckland
20th-century New Zealand people